Jane Mallett (April 17, 1899 – April 14, 1984) was a Canadian actress. She was born as Jean Dawson Keenleyside in London, Ontario, Canada.

Career
Her films included Love at First Sight with Dan Aykroyd, The Sweet and the Bitter, The Yellow Leaf, Nothing Personal, and Improper Channels.  She was a stalwart on CBC Radio from the 1940s to the 1970s, working with such notables as Andrew Allan, John Drainie, and Barry Morse. She was most noted for Travels with Aunt Jane, a 1974 CBC Radio comedy series in which she portrayed the character of "Aunt Jane", an unmarried woman who travelled across Canada to visit her relatives. Television producer Jack Humphrey also created a pilot for a television version of Aunt Jane in 1977, but the show was not picked up to series.

Mallett's stage career included performances with the Shaw Festival of Canada and the Stratford Festival of Canada.

She was named a Member of the Order of Canada in 1975. In 1976, she was a recipient of ACTRA's John Drainie Award.

Following her death in 1984, she was posthumously celebrated in Toronto by the naming of a theatre in her honour at the St. Lawrence Centre for the Arts. The Jane Mallett Theatre is a 498-seat venue, an intimate environment with superior sight lines and exceptional acoustics.  Staffed by professional technicians and equipped with a lighting grid and unique fly system, the semi-circular thrust stage is ideal for concerts, theatrical productions as well as the most demanding high-tech audiovisual presentations.

Filmography

References

External links

Jane Mallett fonds (R2281) at Library and Archives Canada

1899 births
1984 deaths
20th-century Canadian actresses
Canadian stage actresses
Canadian film actresses
Canadian radio actresses
Canadian television actresses
Actresses from London, Ontario
Members of the Order of Canada